The House Intelligence Subcommittee on Intelligence Modernization and Readiness is one of the four subcommittees within the Permanent Select Committee on Intelligence.

Prior to the 116th Congress, it was known as the Subcommittee on the CIA.

Members, 117th Congress

References

External links 
 House Intelligence Committee website

Intelligence CIA